Vorkuta is a town in the Komi Republic, Russia.

Vorkuta may also refer to:
Vorkuta Urban Okrug, a municipal formation which the town of republic significance of Vorkuta in the Komi Republic, Russia is incorporated as
Vorkuta Airport, an airport in the Komi Republic, Russia
Vorkuta (river), a river in the Komi Republic, Russia
Vorkuta Gulag, a Soviet-era prison camp